Devin Gerald Nunes  (born October 1, 1973) is an American businessman and politician who is chief executive officer of the Trump Media & Technology Group (TMTG).

A member of the Republican Party, Nunes was the chair of the House Intelligence Committee from 2015 to 2019. He was also a member of President Donald Trump's transition team. Nunes's former district, numbered as the 21st from 2003 to 2013 and as the 22nd after redistricting, was in the San Joaquin Valley and included most of western Tulare County and much of eastern Fresno County.

In March 2017, the U.S. House intelligence committee, which Nunes chaired at the time, launched an investigation into possible Russian interference in the 2016 United States elections. In February 2018, Nunes publicly released a four-page memorandum alleging an FBI conspiracy against Trump. Nunes subsequently began an investigation of the FBI and the U.S. Justice Department for allegedly abusing their powers in an attempt to hurt Trump. In January 2021, Trump awarded Nunes the Presidential Medal of Freedom.

Early life, education, and early career

Nunes was born on October 1, 1973, the older of two sons of Antonio L. "Anthony" Nunes Jr. and Toni Diane Nunes (née Enas). His grandfather founded Nunes & Sons, a prominent dairy operation in Tulare County. His family operated their farm in California until 2006, when they sold the property and purchased a dairy in Sibley, Iowa.

Nunes is of three-quarters Portuguese descent, with ancestors emigrating from the Azores to California. He has one younger brother, Anthony III. In 2009, Nunes wrote in The Wall Street Journal that he became an entrepreneur at age 14 when he bought seven head of young cattle, learning quickly how to profit from his investment.

After receiving his Associate of Arts degree from the College of the Sequoias in 1993, Nunes graduated from Cal Poly San Luis Obispo with a bachelor's degree in agricultural business in 1995, and a master's degree in agriculture in 1996. After finishing school, Nunes returned to farming.

In 1996, at age 23, Nunes was elected to the College of the Sequoias Board, making him one of California's youngest community college trustees in state history. He served on the board until 2002.

In 2001, President George W. Bush appointed Nunes to serve as California State Director for the United States Department of Agriculture's Rural Development section.

U.S. Congress

Elections

In 1998, Nunes entered the "top two" primary race for California's 20th congressional district seat held by Democrat Cal Dooley. He finished in third place.

In 2002, Nunes ran for the Republican nomination in the 21st congressional district, a new district created by reapportionment after the 2000 United States Census. His principal opponents in the crowded seven-way primary were former Fresno mayor Jim Patterson and state Assemblyman Mike Briggs. Nunes was the only major candidate from Tulare County; Patterson and Briggs were both from Fresno. This was critical, as 58% of the district's population was in Tulare County.

Patterson and Briggs split the vote in Fresno County, allowing Nunes to win by a four-point margin over Patterson, his nearest competitor. Nunes won 46.5% of the vote in Tulare County and 28.1% of the vote in Fresno County. Nunes was also helped by a strong showing in the rural part of the district. He was endorsed by the California Farm Bureau and The Fresno Bee. The district was solidly Republican, and Nunes coasted to victory in November 2002. He was 29 years old.

Nunes faced token Democratic opposition in 2004, 2006, and 2008. He ran unopposed in the 2010 general election.

After the 2010 census, Nunes's district was renumbered the 22nd. It lost most of eastern Tulare County to the neighboring 23rd District, and now has a small plurality of Hispanic voters. Despite these changes, on paper it was no less Republican than its predecessor. Nunes was reelected with 62% of the vote in 2012, 72% in 2014, and 68% in 2016.

During the 2014 election cycle Nunes received approximately $1.4million in political action committee (PAC) contributions. During the 2016 election cycle, he received approximately $1.6million in campaign contributions from PACs.

In 2018, Nunes faced Democratic nominee Andrew Janz, a Fresno County prosecutor. Nunes defeated Janz with 53% of the vote to Janz's 47%, the closest race of Nunes's career.

In 2020, Nunes received 56.5% of the vote in the primary. Nunes defeated Phil Arballo in the general election on November 3, 2020.

Committees and caucuses

In 2015, Nunes became the Chairman of the House Permanent Select Committee on Intelligence.

As co-chair of the U.S.–Mexico Friendship Caucus, he and Democratic Whip Steny Hoyer met with President Felipe Calderón of Mexico in April 2012.

Nunes was a member of the House Baltic Caucus and the U.S.-Japan Caucus.

112th Congress

House Permanent Select Committee on Intelligence
Committee on Ways and Means
Subcommittee on Trade
Subcommittee on Health

114th and 115th Congress

House Permanent Select Committee on Intelligence (Chair)
Committee on Ways and Means

116th and 117th Congress

House Permanent Select Committee on Intelligence (Ranking Member)
Committee on Ways and Means

Resignation
In December 2021, Nunes resigned from the House, effective January 1, 2022, in order to join the Trump Media & Technology Group as chief executive officer.

Political positions

Former Trump campaign CEO and chief strategist Steve Bannon has called Nunes Trump's second-strongest ally in Congress.

Los Angeles Times described him as "one of Trump's most ardent and outlandish defenders in Congress" who "parroted the president's conspiracy theories" and used his position "to try to undermine [the] investigation into Russian interference in the 2016 election."

During the presidency of Donald Trump, Nunes voted in line with the president's stated position 96.2% of the time. As of December 2021, Nunes had voted in line with Joe Biden's stated position 11% of the time.

Energy

On July 28, 2010, Nunes introduced H.R. 5899, "A Roadmap for America's Energy Future", which would have accelerated the exploration and production of fossil fuel, supported the rapid development of market-based alternative energy supplies, and expanded the number of nuclear reactors from 104 to 300 over the next thirty years. Kimberley Strassel of The Wall Street Journal wrote, "It's a bill designed to produce energy, not restrict it" with "no freebies", and "offers a competitive twist to government support of renewable energy."

Environment

Nunes wrote in his book Restoring the Republic that environmental lobbyists were "followers of neo-Marxist, socialist, Maoist or Communist ideals."

In February 2014, during a drought in California, Nunes rejected any link to global warming, claiming "Global warming is nonsense." He has said it was a "man-made drought" due to water restrictions from the Endangered Species Act of 1973 and other environmental regulations that have seen water allocations decline dramatically even in non-drought years.

He criticized the federal government for shutting off portions of California's system of water irrigation and storage and diverting water into a program for freshwater salmon and the delta smelt. Nunes co-sponsored the Sacramento-San Joaquin Valley Emergency Water Delivery Act to stop a project designed to restore a dried-up section of the San Joaquin River. He also co-sponsored the California Emergency Drought Relief Act. The bills passed the House of Representatives in February 2014 and December 2014 respectively, but were not voted on by the Senate.

Fiscal policy

On January 27, 2010, Nunes co-sponsored H.R. 4529, Roadmap for America's Future Act of 2010, the Republican Party's budget proposal.

On December 2, 2010, Nunes introduced H.R. 6484, the Public Employee Pension Transparency Act, which would "provide for reporting and disclosure by State and local public employee retirement pension plans," but it never received a vote.

Nunes has long been a proponent of a consumption tax model and has been influenced by David Bradford. In 2016, he introduced the American Business Competitiveness Act (H.R. 4377), known as the ABC Act, a "cash-flow tax plan" featuring full expensing and a reduction of the highest rate for federal corporate income tax rate to 25%. Nunes's proposal was influential among House Republicans, and had similarities to the House Republican tax plan introduced by Speaker Paul Ryan and Ways and Means Committee Chairman Kevin Brady in June 2016. Conservative economist Douglas Holtz-Eakin said Nunes had "a tremendous impact on the debate" for a non-chairman.

In April 2016, Nunes voted for the Preventing IRS Abuse and Protecting Free Speech Act, a bill that would prevent the IRS from accessing the names of donors to nonprofit organizations. Critics of the bill, which was promoted by the Koch brothers, say IRS access to donor information is important for ensuring foreign funds do not impact U.S. elections.

Nunes voted in support of the Tax Cuts and Jobs Act of 2017.

Health care

In 2009, Nunes co-authored the "Patients' Choice Act" with Paul Ryan (R-WI) in the House, and Tom Coburn (R-OK) and Richard Burr (R-NC) in the Senate. The bill would have established a system of state health insurance exchanges and amended the Internal Revenue Code to allow a refundable tax credit for qualified health care insurance coverage. It also proposed to absorb Medicaid programs into the exchange system. The Patients' Choice Act was incorporated into the "Roadmap for America's Future Act of 2010".

Nunes opposes the Affordable Care Act and has said it cannot be fixed. In 2017 he voted to repeal it.

Immigration and refugees

Nunes supported President Trump's 2017 executive order imposing a temporary ban on entry into the United States by citizens of seven Muslim-majority countries, claiming it was "a common-sense security measure to prevent terror attacks on the homeland".

Intelligence Committee

Nunes opposed the Joint Comprehensive Plan of Action, an international agreement that the U.S. and other major world powers negotiated with Iran, under which Iran was granted partial sanctions relief in exchange for limits on and monitoring of its nuclear activities.

As House Intelligence Committee chairman, Nunes oversaw the Republican-controlled committee's two-year-long investigation into the U.S. response to the 2012 Benghazi attack. The committee's final report found no evidence of wrongdoing on the part of Secretary of State Hillary Clinton or any other Obama administration officials, and concluded that the response of CIA and U.S. military to the attack on the U.S. diplomatic compound was correct. The committee's report debunked "a series of persistent allegations hinting at dark conspiracies" about the attack, determining that "there was no intelligence failure, no delay in sending a CIA rescue team, no missed opportunity for a military rescue, and no evidence the CIA was covertly shipping arms from Libya to Syria", but found "that the State Department facility where [Christopher] Stevens and [Sean] Smith were killed was not well-protected, and that State Department security agents knew they could not defend it from a well-armed attack".

Paul Ryan vacated the chairmanship of the Ways and Means Committee when he replaced John Boehner as Speaker of the House of Representatives. Ryan asked Nunes to stay on the Intelligence Committee, and Nunes complied.

Marijuana policy

Nunes has a "D" rating from the National Organization for the Reform of Marijuana Laws (NORML) for his voting history on cannabis-related causes.

Surveillance

In January 2019, Congress passed a bill Nunes supported, which extends Section 702 of the Foreign Intelligence Surveillance Act (FISA) until 2023, and Trump signed it into law that month. FISA Section 702 allows the National Security Agency to conduct searches of foreigners' communications without a warrant. The process incidentally collects information from Americans. Nunes lauded the bill's passing: "The House of Representatives has taken a big step to ensure the continuation of one of the Intelligence Community's most vital tools for tracking foreign terrorists".

Armenia–Azerbaijan conflict
Nunes accused Turkey, a NATO member, of inciting the conflict between Armenia and Azerbaijan over the disputed region of Nagorno-Karabakh. On October 1, 2020, he co-signed a letter to Secretary of State Mike Pompeo that condemned Azerbaijan's offensive operations against Nagorno-Karabakh, denounced Turkey's role in the conflict and called for an immediate ceasefire.

Transportation

California State Route 99 is a highway running north–south that branches from Interstate 5 at the community of Wheeler Ridge in Kern County and continues northward through the Central Valley until it connects with Interstate 5 again at Red Bluff in Tehama County. In 2005 Nunes introduced H.R. 99, which designated State Route 99 as a congressional High Priority Corridor. The bill also provided federal authorization for Highway 99 to become part of the Interstate Highway System. On February 17, 2011, Nunes introduced H.R. 761, the "San Joaquin Valley Transportation Enhancement Act", which would give the State of California the option to redirect federal high-speed rail funds to finance improvements to Highway 99. H.R. 761 was cosponsored by Jeff Denham (R-CA) and House Majority Whip Kevin McCarthy (R-CA).

U.S. base in Portugal

In 2015, Nunes clashed with the Pentagon over a U.S. base in the Azores, Portugal. He proposed relocating Africa Command and European Command intelligence centers to the Azores, contrary to plans by Pentagon and NATO to create a larger intelligence "fusion" facility in the United Kingdom, maintaining that this would save money because of the Azores' lower living and construction costs. The Pentagon responded by stating "Moving to Lajes Field is very expensive and living is expensive as well." In sum, the Government Accountability Office (GAO) found inaccuracies in the information provided by the Department of Defense to Congress, according to its report.

COVID-19 pandemic

On March 15, 2020, amid the COVID-19 pandemic, Nunes encouraged families who were "healthy" to "go out and go to a local restaurant, likely you can get in easy." This advice contradicted that of the CDC, and WHO, as well as that of Dr. Anthony Fauci, the federal government's leading expert on infectious diseases, who advised people to stay at home if they could. Later, Nunes walked back his comments and claimed that he had encouraged people to use drive-throughs. On March 31, he described California's decision to close schools to halt the spread of coronavirus as "way overkill". Nunes said he wanted people to return to work in one to two weeks.

On March 17, 2020, Nunes told Laura Ingraham on Fox News that the media was exaggerating the threat of COVID-19. He predicted that the crisis would be over by Easter. "There's a good chance we can get through this in the next couple of weeks and for sure by Easter, because we will have a handle on who's getting sick and how to treat them," he said.

Legal issues

Comments about other politicians

During the debate over the Affordable Health Care Act in the House of Representatives, Nunes said of then-Speaker Nancy Pelosi, "For most of the 20th century people fled the ghost of communist dictators and now you are bringing the ghosts back into this chamber." He has also had a long-running dispute with another San Francisco Bay-area Democrat, Senator Dianne Feinstein, over California water policy and other issues, even running a series of advertisements against her in California.

Nunes's criticisms have not been limited to liberals or the Obama administration. During the October 2013 budget standoff, Nunes called certain members of his own Republican Conference who favored a government shutdown "lemmings with suicide vests". "It's kind of an insult to lemmings to call them lemmings" because of their tactics, he said.

In May 2014, Nunes came under fire when he charged that Michigan Congressman and (then) fellow Republican Justin Amash was "al-Qaeda's best friend in Congress" because of Amash's supposed voting record on National Security Agency (NSA) surveillance. At the time, Amash had voted in opposition to a Nunes water bill for California "on constitutional grounds".

Role in Trump–Russia investigation

In February 2017, Nunes, who served on the Trump transition team, was the first leading House Republican to deny that the intelligence community had evidence of contact between the Trump campaign and Russian operatives. He rejected repeated calls for an investigation by a select committee, saying the House should not engage in a "witch hunt" and that "at this point, there's nothing there". Nunes also rejected calls that he request President Trump's tax returns. At a White House communications aide's request, Nunes spoke to a reporter for The Wall Street Journal to challenge a story about the Trump campaign's connections to Russia.

When Trump's national security adviser Michael Flynn resigned after it was revealed that he had allegedly misled Vice President Mike Pence about his communication with Russian officials, Nunes said he would not seek to investigate Flynn's ties to Russia: "From everything that I can see, his conversations with the Russian ambassador—he was doing this country a favor, and he should be thanked for it."

On March 22, 2017, during the House Intelligence Committee's investigation into Russian interference in the 2016 United States elections, Nunes held a press conference to announce that he had received information that the communications of "some members of Trump's transition team, including potentially the president himself" had been "incidentally collected" by the intelligence community and "widely disseminated" throughout the intelligence community. He added that it was legal FISA surveillance, and unrelated to Russia. It was later revealed that it involved Russia and the Trump transition team. The surveillance was of multiple phone conversations between Michael Flynn, a member of the transition team, and Russian Ambassador Sergey Kislyak, which occurred after Flynn sought advice from the Trump transition team at Mar-a-Lago, where they discussed what Flynn should tell Kislyak "about the administration's stance on the sanctions. [Kislyak had contacted Flynn the day before]... members of the team at the president's Florida estate agree that they do not want Russia to escalate the diplomatic crisis. After the initial call, Flynn [spoke] with Kislyak multiple times by phone and urge[d] him not to exacerbate the situation. U.S. intelligence officials intercept[ed] the calls as part of their routine surveillance of foreign dignitaries."

Nunes had met his source for the information one day earlier at the White House grounds, with a spokesman for Nunes claiming this provided "a secure location" to view the material. Although Nunes had characterized his intelligence sources as whistle-blowers whose identities he had to protect, The New York Times reported that they were actually White House officials Ezra Cohen-Watnick and Michael Ellis, while The Washington Post reported that along with Cohen-Watnick and Ellis, a third man, National Security Council lawyer John Eisenberg, was involved.

Nunes was widely criticized for sharing this information with the media and the president before briefing his colleagues on the committee. According to Nunes, the intercepted communications came in November, December and January—after Trump won the election but before he was sworn in as president. Adam Schiff, the ranking Democrat on the committee, and House Democratic leadership called on Nunes to recuse himself from the investigation. He also received criticism from Republican Senators John McCain and Lindsey Graham. The latter compared Nunes's actions to those of the comically incompetent fictional character Inspector Clouseau. Nunes was criticized by Democrats and some Republicans for sharing information on an investigation of the Trump campaign with the administration without communicating it to Schiff, his Democratic Intelligence Committee counterpart.

In late March 2017, Nunes canceled a public hearing in which former acting Attorney General Sally Yates, former National Security Agency Director James Clapper and former CIA Director John Brennan were to testify, saying he wanted to hear FBI Director James Comey and National Security Agency Director Mike Rogers in a classified setting first. Democrats criticized Nunes's decision and said he was trying to protect the White House from damaging revelations.

On April 6, 2017, Nunes temporarily stepped aside from leading the Russia investigation while the Office of Congressional Ethics investigated whether he had "made unauthorized disclosures of classified information, in violation of House Rules, law, regulations, or other standards of conduct" in his March press conference. He called the charges "entirely false and politically motivated". On April 12, 2017, sources from both the Republican and the Democratic parties said the original documents Nunes cited did not support Trump's claims that the Obama administration acted illegally or unusually.

In May 2017, Nunes unilaterally issued three subpoenas seeking documents about former Obama administration officials who requested the unmasking of Trump aides, which led to renewed accusations of colluding with the White House to undercut the Russia probe.

According to Politico, in July 2017 an aide to Nunes secretly sent a pair of Republican staffers to London to contact Christopher Steele. The Los Angeles Times editorial board wrote that Nunes's involvement in the investigation was "threatening the credibility of the probe".

In December 2017, the United States House Committee on Ethics closed its investigation into improper disclosure of classified information by Nunes; the co-chairs of the Committee stated: "The Committee does not determine whether information is or is not classified. In the course of this investigation, the Committee sought the analysis of Representative Nunes's statements by classification experts in the intelligence community. Based solely on the conclusion of these classification experts that the information Representative Nunes disclosed was not classified, the Committee will take no further action and considers this matter closed." In January 2018, The Atlantic cited three congressional sources describing that the Ethics Committee was never able to obtain the classified information it was investigating regarding Nunes's case. In February 2018, Nunes released a four-page memorandum alleging that the FBI's 2016 surveillance of Carter Page, a former member of the Trump campaign, was motivated by bias against Trump. Trump said the Nunes memo vindicated him.

In August 2018, Nunes traveled to London in an attempt to meet with the heads of MI5, MI6, and GCHQ for information about Steele, but was rebuffed by the three agencies.

Role in Trump impeachment inquiry

As the top Republican ("Ranking Member") on the House Intelligence Committee, Nunes was a key player in the Trump impeachment inquiry. During the November 2019 public hearings, he delivered the opening statement for the GOP minority. Nunes used most of the allotted Republican time for questioning himself instead of deferring to the Minority Counsel. Nunes has tried to identify the whistle-blower whose complaint played a part in launching the impeachment inquiry. Further, during the hearings, Nunes repeatedly claimed that Ukraine had attempted to influence the 2016 United States presidential election, one of the conspiracy theories related to the Trump–Ukraine scandal.

In November 2019, Rudy Giuliani's associate Lev Parnas said he had helped Nunes arrange meetings with Ukrainian officials in efforts to procure politically embarrassing "dirt" on former Vice President Joe Biden. Parnas said he would be willing to testify to Congress about his own role as well as Nunes's in the events, which included meeting with disgraced former Ukrainian prosecutor-general Viktor Shokin.

Parnas's attorney Joseph A. Bondy has said that Nunes and his staffer former U.S. Army colonel Derek Harvey met with Parnas several times for updates on claims against Biden and the CrowdStrike/2016 U.S. election conspiracy theory. Parnas's attorney said, "Mr. Parnas learned through Nunes's investigator, Derek Harvey, that the congressman had sequenced this trip to occur after the mid-term elections yet before Congress' return to session, so that Nunes would not have to disclose the trip details to his Democrat colleagues in Congress."

When asked by CNN to comment on his trips overseas to solicit dirt on Biden, Nunes responded, "I don't talk to you in this lifetime or the next lifetime. At any time. On any question."

On November 24, 2019, Nunes alleged in an interview with Fox News that CNN and the Daily Beast had committed crimes reporting on his trips to Europe and that he would pursue legal action against the news organizations for reporting the stories. In the interview, he did not answer the host Maria Bartiromo's question about whether he had met with disgraced former Ukrainian prosecutor Viktor Shokin in 2018, saying he would be detailing all the facts in federal court filings.

That same day, CNBC reported that Lev Parnas was willing to testify under oath in Congress that Nunes's aides called off a 2019 trip to Ukraine to dig up more dirt on Joe Biden when they realized he would have to report the trip to Intelligence Committee Chairman Adam Schiff. CNBC reported that Parnas's allegations "potentially implicate Nunes and his committee staff in the same events the committee is currently investigating. Specifically, the monthslong effort by Trump, Giuliani and others to get Ukrainian officials to help them dig up dirt on Biden, and to validate far-right conspiracies about Ukraine and the 2016 election."

Nunes, who co-sponsored the "Discouraging Frivolous Lawsuits Act", has a long history of filing frivolous lawsuits. On December 4, 2019, Nunes sued CNN for alleged defamation in Nunes v. CNN, seeking $435,350,000 in damages for their reporting of Parnas's lawyer's statement. That month, an attorney for Nunes sent a letter to congressman Ted Lieu threatening to sue over Lieu's comments about Nunes's relationship with Parnas. In response, Lieu wrote, "I welcome any lawsuit from your client and look forward to taking discovery of Congressman Nunes. Or, you can take your letter and shove it." Federal judge Laura Taylor Swain dismissed Nunes's suit against CNN on February 19, 2021.

On December 3, 2019, the report from the House Intelligence Committee regarding the impeachment inquiry documented with call records new information about Rudy Giuliani's interactions with the White House, his associates and Nunes. The frequent contact of Giuliani and Lev Parnas, who has been indicted for criminal activity, with Nunes are regarded as "highly unusual and likely to renew calls from Democrats for Mr. Nunes to face an ethics inquiry." The report detailed call records acquired by subpoenas from AT&T that revealed Nunes to be in contact with Giuliani on April 10, and with Giuliani and Parnas on April 12, described in the report as the same days as other significant actions in the scandal, including phone calls between Giuliani and the White House and the Office of Management and Budget as well as a retainer agreement between Trump-affiliated lawyers diGenova & Toensing and former Ukrainian officials Yuriy Lutsenko and Konstiantyn Kulyk, "two of the primary sources" for articles in The Hill that promoted the conspiracy theory of Ukrainian interference in the 2016 U.S. presidential election. Nunes asserted it was "very unlikely" he had spoken with Parnas, adding, "I don't really recall that name."

After the report was released, CNN analysts suggested the new evidence raises questions about whether Nunes was an investigator or a participant in the Trump–Ukraine scandal.

On January 14, 2020, the House Intelligence Committee released text messages Parnas had provided investigators. Two days later, Nunes acknowledged he had spoken to Parnas, after previously suggesting he had not. The next day, the House Judiciary Committee released text messages between Nunes's top aide Derek Harvey and Parnas in which they discussed arranging meetings for Harvey with Ukrainian officials.

Defamation lawsuits filed by Nunes

Nunes has filed multiple lawsuits characterized as Strategic Lawsuits Against Public Participation ("SLAPP"). Experts have described the lawsuits as "unlikely to succeed" and "virtually free of merit".

On March 18, 2019, Nunes filed defamation lawsuits against Twitter, Elizabeth "Liz" Mair, Mair Strategies LLC, and the Twitter accounts, "Devin Nunes's Mom" (@DevinNunesMom) and "Devin Nunes's Cow" (@DevinCow), seeking $250million in damages. As the story went viral, the popularity of the defendants' accounts soared, gaining more followers than Nunes's own account. The San Francisco Chronicle cited this as an example of the Streisand Effect. Kathryn Watson of CBS News said the filing was "particularly interesting" because in 2018 Nunes supported the "Discouraging Frivolous Lawsuits Act". A filing to quash a subpoena argued that "no reasonable person would believe that Devin Nunes's cow actually has a Twitter account" as cows "do not have the intelligence, language, or opposable digits needed to operate a Twitter account". In June 2020, a judge ruled that Twitter was immune from Nunes's suit because of Section 230 of the Communications Decency Act. In August 2021, the same judge dismissed the second of two suits Nunes had filed against Mair.

In April 2019, Nunes filed a separate $150million defamation lawsuit against the McClatchy Company and others. In May 2018, The Fresno Bee, a local paper owned by McClatchy, reported that in 2016 a former server of Alpha Omega Winery sued the winery, which is partly owned by Nunes. The server alleged that in 2015 some investors of the company held a yacht party that involved cocaine and prostitution. The report said it was "unclear" whether Nunes "was aware of the lawsuit" or involved in the fund-raising event at the yacht. He did not attend the party, nor was he mentioned in the lawsuit. Nunes said the article was politically motivated and improperly linked him to the fund-raiser. A McClatchy spokesperson defended the report and said Nunes's claim was without merit. Some legal experts have speculated that even though both Nunes and McClatchy are based in California, he filed the lawsuit in Virginia because California has enacted stricter rules against strategic defamation lawsuits than Virginia. Kelly McBride of the Poynter Institute said the report did not say or imply that Nunes was at the party. According to her, his intention was to harm the Bee and similar lawsuits are designed to send a chilling effect on journalists.

In August 2019, Nunes sued a group of activists who had tried to force Nunes to stop using "farmer" as his occupation on the 2018 ballot. The activists had argued that Nunes's parents had long ago moved the family dairy farm to Iowa and Nunes himself had no apparent farming connection left other than a small investment in a friend's Napa valley winery.

In September 2019, Nunes sued political journalist Ryan Lizza and Hearst Magazines, the publisher of Esquire, alleging that a 2018 Esquire story had damaged his reputation. Lizza wrote that Nunes's family had "secretly" moved its dairy operation from California to Iowa in 2007. Nunes did not specifically contest the veracity of Lizza's reporting, but claimed he "fabricated a 'secret' where none existed". By the time Esquire published the piece, The Bee had already covered the move to Iowa. Nunes alleged in the suit that "Lizza stalked Plaintiff's grammar-school aged nieces, behaved like a sex offender or pedophile cruising the local neighborhood for victims, frightened a family member to tears, and exploited a grieving mother." United States District Judge C. J. Williams, a Trump appointee, dismissed this suit in its entirety on August 5, 2020. On September 15, 2021, the Eighth Circuit Court upheld the dismissal of some counts but remanded the case back to the district court. A similar lawsuit filed by Nunes's father and brother against the same defendants remains in litigation.

In September 2019, Nunes sued the liberal nonprofit Campaign for Accountability (CfA) and the opposition research firm Fusion GPS. The latter was hired to dig up dirt on Trump at the behest of Hillary Clinton's presidential campaign. The research was compiled into the Steele dossier. In 2018 CfA filed three ethics complaints against Nunes. In the lawsuit he alleged that CfA and Fusion GPS had conspired to hinder his investigation into the dossier, citing a $138,684 payment from CfA to Fusion GPS. CfA said it did not hire Fusion GPS to investigate Nunes.

On December 4, 2019, Nunes sued CNN for alleged defamation, seeking $435,350,000 in damages for their reporting of Parnas's lawyer's statement. The complaint stated, "CNN is the mother of fake news. It is the least trusted name. CNN is eroding the fabric of America, proselytizing, sowing distrust and disharmony. It must be held accountable." He claimed that the network has an "institutional hatred" for the Republican Party. The suit alleges that CNN reported that Nunes traveled to Vienna in December 2018, and met with Viktor Shokin, the former Ukrainian prosecutor general, about investigating Joe Biden. The suit claims this is untrue and that Nunes was in Benghazi, followed by Malta. Before the filing of the CNN suit, an attorney representing McClatchy in Nunes's suit told The Washington Post's Eric Wemple, "He's filing these lawsuits and threatening these lawsuits purely to try to chill speech about himself and matters of public interest." Federal judge Laura Taylor Swain dismissed the suit on February 19, 2021.

On December 31, 2019, Nunes, through his Charlottesville, Virginia, attorney Steven S. Biss, issued a letter that threatened litigation against Representative Ted Lieu based on alleged damage to Nunes's reputation. Lieu responded, "I welcome any lawsuit from your client and look forward to taking discovery of Congressman Nunes. Or, you can take your letter and shove it."

Conservative Political Action Conference attendance
In late February 2021, Nunes and a dozen other Republican House members skipped votes and enlisted others to vote for them, citing the ongoing COVID-19 pandemic. But he and the other members were actually attending the Conservative Political Action Conference, which was held at the same time as their absences. In response, the Campaign for Accountability, an ethics watchdog group, filed a complaint with the House Committee on Ethics and requested an investigation into Nunes and the other lawmakers.

Personal life

The Nunes family is of Portuguese descent, immigrating from the Azores to California in the early 20th century. Nunes wrote a foreword to the 1951 novel Home Is An Island by Portuguese-American author Alfred Lewis for the 2012 edition by Tagus Press, an imprint of the Center for Portuguese Culture and Studies at the University of Massachusetts at Dartmouth.

Nunes married Elizabeth Nunes (née Tamariz), an elementary school teacher, in 2003. They have three daughters. Nunes is a practicing Catholic, and attends Mass in Tulare.

Honors

President Donald Trump awarded Nunes the Presidential Medal of Freedom on January 4, 2021, along with fellow Representative Jim Jordan. No media were allowed to document the ceremony. In a press release from the Trump White House before the ceremony, Nunes was described as having exposed illegal wiretapping by the Obama administration on Trump and the Trump campaign, as part of the unsubstantiated Trump Tower wiretapping allegations. In the same release Nunes is praised as having helped "thwart a plot to take down a sitting United States president", in reference to his work to discredit the allegations (which the release calls the "Russia Hoax") leading to Trump's first impeachment.

Nunes has received the following foreign honors: 
 Grand-Officer of the Order of Prince Henry, Portugal (June 7, 2013)
 Commander of the Order of the Star of Romania, Romania (June 8, 2017)

References

External links

Profile at SourceWatch
Smart Voter's election results for 2002, 2004, 2006

|-

|-

|-

|-

1973 births
21st-century American politicians
American conspiracy theorists
American people of Azorean descent
American people of Portuguese descent
American Roman Catholics
California Polytechnic State University alumni
Catholics from California
College of the Sequoias alumni
Commanders of the Order of the Star of Romania
Grand Officers of the Order of Prince Henry
Living people
People from Tulare, California
People from Visalia, California
Presidential Medal of Freedom recipients
Republican Party members of the United States House of Representatives from California
Trump–Ukraine scandal
United States Department of Agriculture officials
21st-century American businesspeople